Edward Siarka (born 7 July 1963 in Rabka) is a Polish politician. He was elected to the Sejm on 25 September 2005, getting 10,778 votes in 14 Nowy Sącz district as a candidate from the Law and Justice list.

He was re-elected on 10 October 2019.

See also
Members of Polish Sejm 2005-2007

References 

1963 births
Living people
People from Rabka-Zdrój
Law and Justice politicians
Members of the Polish Sejm 2005–2007
Members of the Polish Sejm 2007–2011
Members of the Polish Sejm 2011–2015
Members of the Polish Sejm 2015–2019
Members of the Polish Sejm 2019–2023